Podisma pedestris is a species of 'short-horned grasshoppers' belonging to the family Acrididae subfamily Melanoplinae.

Distribution
This small wingless grasshopper is present in most of Europe and in eastern Palearctic realm through to temperate, mainland east Asia.

Description
They can be encountered from mid June through October in dry meadows, in rocky slopes of mountains, alpine pastures and forest clearings. They feed on grasses and herbaceous plants. The females lay their eggs on the ground.

 The basic coloration of the body varies from dark-brownish to yellowish, with black and yellow trasversal stripes on the sides of the abdomen. The males have brighter and more intense colours and more extensive black markings than the females. A dark longitudinal stripe runs from the eye to pronotum. The femora of the hind legs are reddish, while tibiae are bluish with white spines.

In both sexes the vestigial wings are oval, very short and unfit to flight (brachyptery), resembling those of a nymph. This species sometimes has well-developed wings, enabling to fly.

Subspecies
 Podisma pedestris var. caprai  Salfi, 1935 
 Podisma pedestris var. nadigi  Harz, 1975 
 Podisma pedestris var. pedestris  (Linnaeus, 1758) 
 Podisma pedestris var. sviridenkoi  Dovnar-Zapolskii, 1927

References

External links
 Fauna Europaea
 Biolib
 Www1.osu.cz
 

Acrididae
Grasshoppers described in 1758
Orthoptera of Europe
Orthoptera of Asia
Taxa named by Carl Linnaeus